Alcester Abbey was a Benedictine monastery in Alcester, Warwickshire in England, founded in 1138 by the Botellers of Oversley, Warwickshire. Its many endowments included the Chapel of St. James and St. Peter, near Shaftesbury, Dorset; the manor of Blynfield in the parish of St. James, which is known as the 'Manor of Alcester and Bec'; and a number of other churches and estates.

The last of its priors was Richard Tutbury, from 1459 to 1466. In 1467 it was annexed by Evesham Abbey, from whence it had a prior or warden who was an Evesham monk. In 1536 its ownership was transferred to Thomas Cromwell. Little now remains of the site.

References 

Benedictine monasteries in England
Monasteries in Warwickshire
1138 establishments in England
Religious organizations established in the 1130s
Christian monasteries established in the 12th century
1536 disestablishments in England
Alcester